Batrachedra concitata is a moth in the family Batrachedridae. It is found in North America, where it has been recorded from Arizona, New Mexico and Texas.

The wingspan is about 16 mm. Adults have been recorded on wing from September to November.

References

Natural History Museum Lepidoptera generic names catalog

Batrachedridae
Moths described in 1928